Topsy is an unincorporated community located in Wayne County, Tennessee.
A volunteer fire department and a small store are located in Topsy.

Topsy was named after a local mule noticed by the naming committee when they were unable to come up with another suitable name.

References

Unincorporated communities in Tennessee
Unincorporated communities in Wayne County, Tennessee